Virginia Crawford (née Powell; born September 7, 1983) is a retired American track and field athlete who specialises in the sprint hurdles. She now is a 4th grade teacher after retiring track and field.

She began her international track career at the 1999 World Youth Championships in Athletics, and she reached the final of the 100 meter hurdles competition. She won her first major medal at the 2006 IAAF World Cup, finishing in 12.90 seconds. She first competed in the IAAF World Championships in Athletics in 2005, and reached the final of the sprint hurdles competition at the 2007 and 2009 editions, finishing fifth and sixth respectively.

Powell is a two-time US national champion over the 100 meter hurdles, winning the title in 2006 and 2007. She was also a successful collegiate athlete, winning two NCAA Women's Outdoor Track and Field Championships while a student at the University of Southern California. At the 2006 NCAA meet, she finished the semi-finals in 12.55 seconds (breaking Gail Devers' collegiate record) and won the final the following day in 12.48 seconds, setting a world-leading time.

In 2006, she won the Honda Sports Award as the nation's best female collegiate track and field athlete.

In 2010, she married Shawn Crawford who is an olympic medalist for track and field.

Personal bests

All information taken from IAAF profile.

References

External links
 
 
 Virginia Powell at USC Trojans
 Flotrack video interviews of Virginia Powell

1983 births
Living people
American female hurdlers
University of Southern California alumni
Track and field athletes from California
USA Indoor Track and Field Championships winners
USC Trojans women's track and field athletes